Surkhob (Tajik: Сурхоб/سرخاب) is a jamoat in Tajikistan. It is located in Lakhsh District, one of the Districts of Republican Subordination. The jamoat has a total population of 2,987 (2015). Villages: Duaghba (the seat), Dashti Murghon, Busholon, Obshoron, Khushhol, Maydonterak.

References

Populated places in Districts of Republican Subordination
Jamoats of Tajikistan